She Will Reign (foaled 26 August 2014) is a retired Australian thoroughbred racehorse. She is a Dual Group 1 winning Filly having won the 2017 Group 1 2YO Golden Slipper over 1200m at Rosehill Gardens, and the 2017 Group 1 WFA Moir Stakes at Moonee Valley.

In 2017 she won the $3.5 million Golden Slipper Stakes after being purchased as a yearling for just $20,000.

In 2018 she was retired from racing as a four year old due to inflammation found in the lower airway. She will begin duties as a broodmare in the northern hemisphere.

References

2014 racehorse births